The 2014 Asian Men's Junior Handball Championship is the 14th edition of the Asian Men's Junior Handball Championship held from 2–14 August 2014 at Tabriz, I. R. Iran under the aegis of Asian Handball Federation. It also acts as the qualification tournament for the 2015 Men's Junior World Handball Championship. Qatar wins the title by beating South Korea in the final match.

Draw

Group A

Group B

Placement matches

9th–10th-place match

7th–8th-place match

5th–6th-place match

Knockout stage

Knockout stage table

Semifinal matches

Bronze-medal match

Final match

Final standings

References

Handball
Asian Men's Junior
Asian Handball Championships
Asian Men's Junior Handball Championship
Asian Men's Junior Handball Championship